Galaxea acrhelia is a large polyp stony coral in the family Euphylliidae.

Distribution
It can be found uncommonly throughout the Indo-West Pacific with populations concentrating in Indonesia, the Philippines, Papua New Guinea, and the Solomon Islands.

References 

Euphylliidae
Animals described in 2000